was a versatile Japanese amateur photographer who specialized in landscapes.

Born in Tokyo in 1893 as Kiyonosuke Nishiyama, Nishiyama became interested in photography at 15. He intended to become a professional photographer and learned retouching in a photographic studio at Ryōgoku, but never turned professional, instead in 1921 setting up a photographic supplies shop, Heiwadō, in Nihonbashi, and at about the same time starting up and leading a photographic club, the Pleasant Club (Purezanto Kurabu), and submitting his photographs to photographic magazines.

In 1922 Nishiyama won the first prize for his submission, taken with a Vest Pocket Kodak, to a competition at the Heiwa Kinen Tōkyō Hakurankai. A year later he lost all his photographs and cameras in the Great Kantō earthquake, but persevered and held the first exhibition of the Pleasant Club in 1924.  Nishiyama was impressed by the "light and its harmony" aesthetic of Shinzō Fukuhara, who invited him to join the Japan Photographic Society; Nishiyama soon thereafter had a solo exhibition at the Shiseido Gallery.

From 1925 Nishiyama began the first of several series of photographs in Photo Times (Foto Taimusu) magazine; these were on a variety of subjects but most notable was Nishiyama's portrayal of the cityscape of Tokyo after the earthquake. From 1928 Shirai used a Rolleiflex camera, and turned this to photographing Nikkō and bunraku (the subjects of solo exhibitions); he later added a Leica, but from 1959 changed to a Nikon F that he always used with a 50 mm lens. Virtually all of Nishiyama's prewar work was destroyed in the bombing of Tokyo.

Nishiyama continued to exhibit and publish after the war. In 1954 he won the PSJ award, and in 1977 he was awarded the Order of the Rising Sun, 5th class, for his services to photography. He died on 5 March 1983. Nishiyama's work is held in the permanent collections of the Tokyo Metropolitan Museum of Photography and Nihon University (which preserves what little remains of Nishiyama's prewar work).

Solo exhibitions by Nishiyama

Shiseido Gallery (Ginza, Tokyo), 1920s
"Nikkō", Matsuzakaya (Ueno, Tokyo), 1929. Photographs of Nikkō.
"Bunraku", Nihon Salon (Ginza, Tokyo), 1935. Photographs of bunraku.
"Nihon no fūbutsu: Kita kara minami", Matsuya (Ginza, Tokyo), 1958. Photographs of Japanese scenery.
"Okinawa no fūbutsu", Marunouchi Gekkō Gallery (Marunouchi, Tokyo), 1960. Photographs of Okinawan scenery.
"Nihon no tō", Marunouchi Gekkō Gallery (Marunouchi, Tokyo), 1964. Photographs of Japanese pagodas.
"Koyomi", Marunouchi Gekkō Gallery (Marunouchi, Tokyo), 1973. Photographs of the calendar.

Books by Nishiyama
Arusu geijutsu shashin gashū dai-2-hen ( Ars art photograph collection, 2nd ed). Tokyo: Ars, 1926. 
Hikinobashi no jissai (The facts of enlarging). Asahi Camera Sōsho 11. Tokyo: Asahi Shinbunsha, 1936. 
Kotō o tazunete (Visiting old pagodas). Tokyo: Jinbutsu-ōraisha, 1964. 
Nihon no kotō (The pagodas of Japan). Tokyo: Kenkōsha, 1972. 
Shunkō shūshoku / Seasonal Aspects of Japan. Sonorama Shashin Sensho 21. Tokyo: Asahi Sonorama, 1979.

Notes

Japanese photographers
People from Tokyo
Writers on photographic techniques
1893 births
1983 deaths
Recipients of the Order of the Rising Sun, 5th class